Swanborough Manor is a listed English manor dating back to the 12th century in Iford, East Sussex.

Overview
It is located on Swanborough Drove in Iford, East Sussex.

It was built in about 1200. However, it was extended in the 15th century, with an additional ceiling. Indeed, the gateway, the great chimney breast, a quatrefoil peephole, and parts of a screen with arched blank panelling all date back to the 15th century.

It was listed as Grade I by English Heritage in 1952.

History
It previously belonged to Henry VIII of England (1491-1547), followed by Oliver Cromwell (1599-1658).

More recently, it belonged to Rufus Isaacs, 1st Marquess of Reading and Stella Isaacs, Marchioness of Reading (1894-1971). After her death, Stella, a.k.a. Baroness Swanborough, donated it to the University of Sussex located in Falmer, to be used as a residence for the Vice-Chancellor. However, from 1971 to 1985, it was used as housing for postgraduates and lecturers. It was only used as the main residence of the Vice-Chancellor from 1985 to 1997.

However, former Vice-Chancellor Alasdair Smith sold it in 2003, arguing the upkeep was too costly for the university. Baroness Swanborough's step-great-grandson, Simon Isaacs, 4th Marquess of Reading, openly criticized the university for selling it, adding that the university should have striven to find ways to keep it for at least fifty years after her death, in 2021, according to her wishes.

References

English Heritage sites in East Sussex
Country houses in East Sussex
Grade I listed houses
Grade I listed buildings in East Sussex
University of Sussex